Koirganwan is a village in West Champaran district in the Indian state of Bihar.

Demographics
As of the 2011 Indian census, Koirganwan had a population of 1699 in 325 households. Males constitute 50.67% of the population and females 49.32%. Koirganwan has an average literacy rate of 55.79%, lower than the national average of 74%: male literacy is 61.39%, and female literacy is 38.1%. In Koirganwan, 15.5% of the population is under 6 years of age.

References

Villages in West Champaran district